Bodmin St Petroc's is an electoral division of Cornwall in the United Kingdom which returns one member to sit on Cornwall Council. It was created at the 2021 local elections, being preceded by the smaller Bodmin St Petroc division. The current councillor is Leigh Frost, a Liberal Democrat.

Extent
Bodmin St Petroc's represents the centre and east of the town of Bodmin, the hamlet of Cooksland, and parts of the hamlet of Fletchersbridge (which is shared with the Lanivet, Blisland and Bodmin St Lawrence division).

Election results

2021 election

References

Electoral divisions of Cornwall Council
Bodmin